Club Atlético San Cristóbal was a Venezuelan professional football club and the club won one First Division title in the professional era. The club was based in San Cristóbal, Táchira. In 1986 it merged with Deportivo Táchira to form Unión Atlético Táchira.

History
The club was founded in 1980 as Club Atlético San Cristóbal, and participated in the 1983 Copa Libertadores.

Honours

National
Venezuelan Primera División: 1
Winners (1): 1982
Venezuelan Segunda División: 1
Winners (1): 1981

Performance in CONMEBOL competitions
Copa Libertadores: 1 appearance
1983 - Semifinals

Defunct football clubs in Venezuela
Táchira
Association football clubs established in 1980
1980 establishments in Venezuela
Association football clubs disestablished in 1986
1986 disestablishments in Venezuela
San Cristóbal, Táchira